Musan Salama (acronym MuSa) is a football club based in Pori, Finland, currently playing in the Finnish second tier Kakkonen. It was founded in 1960 in the Musa suburb of Pori. Literally, the name of the club means the ″Lightning of Musa″.

Musan Salama has mostly played in the Finnish third or fourth levels. In 1999–2001 MuSa made a three-year spell to the second tier Ykkönen, but was relegated after the 2001 season. In 2016 MuSa made it to the promotion play-offs losing to the Helsinki side Gnistan on penalties. Finally, in 2018 MuSa achieved promotion back to the second tier Ykkönen by defeating Kokkola based side GBK in the finals of the promotion playoffs on penalties. 

MuSa is a member of the Finnish Workers' Sports Federation.

Division history 2000–2020

 2000 Ykkönen – 9th
 2001 Ykkönen – 10th (relegated)
 2002 Kakkonen – 7th
 2003 Kakkonen – 7th
 2004 Kakkonen – 7th
 2005 Kakkonen – 12th (relegated)
 2006 Kolmonen – 1st (promoted)

 2007 Kakkonen – 13th (relegated)
 2008 Kolmonen – 2nd
 2009 Kolmonen – 1st (promoted)
 2010 Kakkonen – 9th
 2011 Kakkonen – 13th (relegated)
 2012 Kolmonen – 1st (promoted)
 2013 Kakkonen – 9th (relegated)

 2014 Kolmonen – 1st (promoted)
 2015 Kakkonen – 2nd
 2016 Kakkonen – 2nd (promotion play-offs)
 2017 Kakkonen – 2nd
 2018 Kakkonen - 1st (promoted via Playoffs)
 2019 Ykkönen – 5th
 2020 Ykkönen – 5th

Squad 2021
.

References

External links
MuSa's official website 

Football clubs in Finland
Sport in Pori
1960 establishments in Finland
Musan Salama
Sport in Satakunta